Hyatt Regency Dushanbe Hotel is a hotel located at Dushanbe, Tajikistan. It is operated by Hyatt Hotels Corporation. The hotel is served by the Foccacia Grill Restaurant.

References

External links
Official site

Hotels in Tajikistan
Buildings and structures in Dushanbe
Hyatt Hotels and Resorts
Hotel buildings completed in 2008